Raymondville is a city in and the county seat of Willacy County, Texas, United States. The population was 11,284 at the 2010 census. It may be included as part of the Brownsville–Harlingen–Raymondville and the Matamoros–Brownsville metropolitan areas.

Raymondville was formed in 1904 by Edward Burleson Raymond, a foreman of the El Sauz Ranch portion of the King Ranch and owner of the Las Majadas Ranch.

Geography

Raymondville is located at  (26.481464, –97.783013) and is known as the "Gateway to the Rio Grande Valley." According to the United States Census Bureau, the city has a total area of 3.8 square miles (9.8 km2), all of it land.

Soils are mostly clay or sandy clay loams which are well drained or moderately well drained. Some fine sandy loams underlie the eastern part of town. These have near neutral pH. Other parts of town have moderately alkaline, somewhat saline soils. Around the southern edge of town is an area of strong salinity which imposes limitations on farmers and gardeners.

Climate

The climate in this area is characterized by hot, humid summers and generally mild to cool winters.  According to the Köppen climate classification, Raymondville has a humid subtropical climate, Cfa on climate maps.

Demographics

2020 census

As of the 2020 United States census, there were 10,236 people, 2,826 households, and 2,151 families residing in the city.

2000 census
As of the census of 2000,  9,733 people, 2,514 households, and 2,016 families were residing in the city. The population density was 2,564.4 people/sq mi (988.9/km2). The 2,842 housing units had an average density of 748.8/sq mi (288.8/km2). The racial makeup of the city was 69.91% White, 3.91% African American, 0.59% Native American, 0.10% Asian, 23.29% from other races, and 2.20% from two or more races. Hispanics or Latinos of any race were 86.63% of the population.

Of the 2,514 households, 41.0% had children under 18 living with them, 57.6% were married couples living together, 18.8% had a female householder with no husband present, and 19.8% were not families. About 18.4% of all households were made up of individuals, and 11.8% had someone living alone who was 65 or older. The average household size was 3.45, and the average family size was 3.97.

In the city, the age distribution was 29.9% under 18, 13.1% from 18 to 24, 27.8% from 25 to 44, 17.5% from 45 to 64, and 11.7% who were 65 or older. The median age was 30 years. For every 100 females, there were 117.5 males. For every 100 females age 18 and over, there were 119.5 males.

The median income for a household in the city was $19,729, and for a family was $23,799. Males had a median income of $20,034 versus $14,502 for females. The per capita income for the city was $8,910. About 32.7% of families and 36.2% of the population were below the poverty line, including 45.0% of those under age 18 and 30.7% of those age 65 or over.

In 2010, Raymondville was 77% Catholic, 10.5% Southern Baptist, and 4% United Methodist.

Infrastructure

Raymondville is the location of three private prisons, all adjacent to each other:

 The Willacy County Correctional Center, owned and operated by the Management and Training Corporation under contract with the U.S. Immigration and Customs Enforcement, is located on the east side of Interstate 69E/U.S. Route 77.  Constructed in 45 days, it opened in 2006 and closed in March 2015 after destructive riots; the center was a large "tent city" federal holding center for illegal immigrants.

 The Willacy County Regional Detention Center, or the Willacy Detention Center opened in 2003.  It is operated by Management and Training Corporation housing federal prisoners for the U.S. Marshal Service.
 The Willacy County State Jail, operated by the Corrections Corporation of America under contract with the Texas Department of Criminal Justice, is a medium-security facility with a capacity of 1069.  CCA has managed this facility since 2004.  This facility was opened by Wackenhut, now GEO Group, in 1996.  On April 26, 2001, inmate Gregorio De La Rosa, Jr., was beaten to death by other prisoners.  This incident caused a $42.5 million civil settlement against Wackenhut.

The United States Postal Service operates the Raymondville Post Office.

The Raymondville Independent School District serves the city.

The Reber Memorial Library is located in Raymondville.

The Raymondville Chronicle and Willacy County News, a weekly newspaper, is published in Raymondville.

Notable people

 Clinton Manges (1923–2010), businessman; lived in Raymondville, married a native belle, built and owned a bowling alley
 Angela Via (born 1981), Singer; was born and raised in Raymondville

Films
Raymondville's history was the subject of the film, Valley of Tears. The movie visits the Mexican-American community that had worked the onion fields of rural South Texas in three different eras, observing how the seeds of change planted 20 years ago seem ready to bear fruit today. Politicians and officials interviewed in the film include Larry Spence, former District Attorney Juan Angel Guerra, Paul Whitworth, Wetegrove families, Dr. Allan Spence, and school-board and city-council members.

References

External links 
 Handbook of Texas Online

Cities in Willacy County, Texas
Cities in Texas
County seats in Texas
Micropolitan areas of Texas
Populated places established in 1904
1904 establishments in Texas